Barcelona continued the frustrating run of league title drought, finishing just fourth in La Liga, despite having bought Marc Overmars and Emmanuel Petit for a total of £54m in transfer fees in the summer of 2000. Barcelona also controversially sold Luís Figo to arch-rivals Real Madrid in July 2000 and thus creating several furious fan reactions, accusing Luís Figo of being a traitor. New coach Lorenzo Serra Ferrer was not finding consistent form with the team and was being put under increasing pressure, and when Barcelona looked to be missing out on Champions League qualification, he was sacked in late April 2001. Barcelona dramatically sealed Champions League 3rd qualifying spot in the season finale, thanks to a Rivaldo hat-trick which included a bicycle kick goal against Valencia.

Squad
Correct as of 3 October 2009.

Transfers

In

Total spending:   €78.5 million

Out

Total income:    €69.9 million
{|

Competitions

Pre-season and friendlies

La Liga

League table

Results by round

Matches

UEFA Champions League

First Group stage

Group H

UEFA Cup

Third round

Eightfinals

Quarter-finals

Semifinals

Copa del Rey

Round of 64

Round of 32

Round of 16

Quarterfinals

Semifinals

Statistics

Players statistics

See also
FC Barcelona
2000–01 UEFA Champions League
2000–01 La Liga
2000–01 Copa del Rey
2000–01 UEFA Cup

References

External links
 
 FCBarcelonaweb.co.uk English Speaking FC Barcelona Supporters
 ESPNsoccernet: Barcelona Team Page 
 FC Barcelona (Spain) profile
 uefa.com - UEFA Champions League
 Web Oficial de la Liga de Fútbol Profesional
 
 

FC Barcelona seasons
Barcelona